Jack Hokeah (December 4, 1901 - December 14, 1969) was a Kiowa painter, one of the Kiowa Six, from Oklahoma.

Early life
Jack Hokeah was born in 1901 in western Oklahoma. He was orphaned at a very young age and raised by his grandmother. His grandfather was the Kiowa warrior White Horse.

Hokeah attend St. Patrick's Indian Mission School in Anadarko, Oklahoma, and there he received his first art instruction from Sister Olivia Taylor, a Choctaw nun. Susan Peters, the field matron for the Kiowa agency, arranged for Mrs. Willie Baze Lane, an artist from Chickasha, Oklahoma, to provide further art instruction for the young Indians, including Spencer Asah. Recognizing the talent of some of the young artists, Peters convinced Swedish-American artist Oscar Jacobson, director of the University of Oklahoma's School of Art, to accept the Kiowa students into a special program at the school, in which they were coached and encouraged by Edith Mahier.

Kiowa Six
The Kiowa Six included Spencer Asah, James Auchiah, Jack Hokeah, Stephen Mopope, Lois Smoky Kaulaity, and Monroe Tsatoke. In 1926 Asah, Hokeah, Tsatoke, Mopope, and Smoky moved to Norman, Oklahoma and began their art studies at OU. Smoky returned home late in 1927, but Auchiah joined the group that year.

In the 1928, the Kiowa Fives debuted in the international fine arts world by participating in the First International Art Exposition in Prague, Czechoslovakia. Dr. Jacobson arranged for their work to be shown in several other countries and for Kiowa Art, a portfolio of pochoir prints and artists' paintings, to be published in France.

Individual pursuits
Jack Hokeah was an excellent dancer and singer, which competed with painting for his time. He, alone of the Kiowa Six, studied at the Studio in Santa Fe Indian School.

In 1930, with Spencer Asah and Stephen Mopope, Hokeah participated in the Gallup Inter-Tribal Indian Ceremonial Dances. There he befriended celebrated San Ildefonso Pueblo potter Maria Martinez, who ultimately adopted him as son. He stayed with her family many times in the ensuing decade.

Public collections 
Hokeah's work can be found in the following public art collections:

Anadarko City Museum
Cleveland Museum of Art
Denver Art Museum
The George Gustav Heye Center
Gilcrease Museum
Indian Arts and Crafts Board, US Department of the Interior
 Joclyn Art Museum
McNay Art Museum
Museum of Fine Arts, Houston
Museum of Northern Arizona
Museum of Northern Arizona, Katherine Harvey Collection
Museum of New Mexico
Millicent Rogers Museum
Philbrook Museum of Art
Seminole Public Library
Southern Plains Indian Museum

Death
Hokeah died in Fort Cobb, Oklahoma, on December 14, 1969.

Notes

References
Lester, Patrick D. The Biographical Directory of Native American Painters. Norman and London: The Oklahoma University Press, 1995. .
Lydia L. Wyckoff, ed. Visions and voices : Native American painting from the Philbrook Museum of Art. Tulsa, OK: Philbrook Museum of Art, 1996.

External links
 Jacobson House Native Art Center: About the Kiowa Six
 Jack Hokeah, Oklahoma Historical Society

Kiowa people
Native American painters
Painters from Oklahoma
People from Anadarko, Oklahoma
People from Norman, Oklahoma
1901 births
1969 deaths